The Wende Museum is an art museum, historical archive of the Cold War, and center for creative community engagement in Culver City, California.

Mission 

Wende (pronounced “venda”) is a German word that translates into English as “transformation.” It commonly refers to the era of uncertainty and possibility leading up to and following the fall of the Berlin Wall in 1989 and the subsequent dissolution of the Soviet Union in 1991. 

Embracing a spirit of continual transformation as part of its mission, the Wende aspires to reach beyond the conventional walls of a museum, placing equal value on international scholarship, community engagement, digital access, and wide-ranging experimentation.

Founded in 2002, the Wende Museum holds one of the largest collections of art and artifacts from the Cold War era, which serves as a foundation for programs that illuminate political and cultural changes of the past, offer opportunities to make sense of a changing present, and inspire active participation in personal and social change for a better future.

The Wende aims to explore and inspire change through

 collecting, preserving, and providing open access to artwork, artifacts, archives, films, and personal histories from the sphere touched by socialism during the Cold War era (1945–1991);
 promoting rigorous scholarship, educating students, and stimulating general interest through lectures, symposia, publications, and providing access to digitized collections;
 presenting experimental exhibitions and interdisciplinary programming inspired by the collection;
 facilitating creative collaborations with contemporary artists and designers;
 partnering with other nonprofit organizations; and
 providing community services such as wellness programs, opportunities for civic engagement, and family-friendly activities.

Collections

The Wende's collections are a resource for learning about the vanishing cultural, political, and artistic histories of the former East Bloc countries and the Soviet Union, as well as countries with a history of socialism including China, Vietnam, and North Korea. The Wende supports emerging fields of aesthetic and academic study in visual and material culture studies as well as cultural history. The museum promotes a multi-layered exploration and discussion of the Cold War era on a global scale.

The collection focuses on:

 materials originating from East Germany, with more than 50% of the collection from the GDR;
 items used in everyday life and artworks capturing lived experience;
 materials that document "Wende Moments," or junctures in Cold War history marked by extreme change—beginnings, endings, and transformative events such as the formation of the Warsaw Pact, the fall of the Berlin Wall, German reunification, and the collapse of the Soviet Union;
 and official and unofficial artwork.

The collection ranges from consumer products (e.g., computers, radios, records, toiletries, foodstuff) to works of modern and contemporary art in all media (e.g., paintings, drawings, sculptures, graphics, photographs), iconic political symbols (e.g., statuary, medals, flags, uniforms, commemorative gifts), and archives—including a substantial gift from East German leader Erich Honecker's estate—and some 3,500 16mm documentary, animation, and educational films as well as home movies from the GDR. The museum contains large collections of furniture, flags and banners, commemorative plates, communist folk art, menus, family albums, and design items. In recent years, the museum has acquired collections of Hungarian Cold War era artworks and artifacts, Russian hippie materials from the 1960s and 1970s, Polish solidarity materials, Soviet demilitarization albums, and artifacts from the now-shuttered KGB Espionage Museum.The museum's East German collections are the subject of a major publication, Beyond the Wall: Art and Artifacts from the GDR/ Jenseits der Mauer. Kunst und Alltagsgegenstände aus der DDR (TASCHEN, 2014). In 2019, TASCHEN published a smaller second edition of the book, The East German Handbook, featuring text in both English and German.

The museum's collections have been exhibited in a number of other museums and institutions, including the Los Angeles County Museum of Art, Imperial War Museum (London), Harry S. Truman Presidential Library and Museum (Independence, MO), Ronald Reagan Presidential Library (Simi Valley, CA), Gerald Ford Presidential Library (Ann Arbor, MI), the International Spy Museum (Washington, D.C.), and the Getty Research Institute (Los Angeles).

Historical Witness Project 
The Wende Museum’s Historical Witness Project provides insight into life behind the Iron Curtain through the collection, preservation, and sharing of oral histories from people who lived in the former Eastern Bloc. Supported by Joel Aronowitz and Fiona Chalom, the project exists so that both historical witnesses and younger generations can encounter, reflect upon, and learn from personal testimonies that illuminate history as lived experience.

In 2011, The Albanian Human Rights Project deposited its archive at the Wende Museum, including more than 70 filmed interviews with survivors of political persecution in Albania.

Events and Public Programs 

The museum’s public programming and educational initiatives provide resources and opportunities for individuals to interpret the past and to discover the global implications of the Cold War today. The museum uses the Cold War as a lens to examine contemporary life and creative expression, and to draw parallels between the past and the present day. 

Music at the Wende is a free concert series in which musical organizations present programs inspired by the Wende’s mission. Launched in October 2018, Music at the Wende has been held for two seasons and included performances by (Monday) Evening Concerts, Jacaranda Music, Delirium Musicum, Hear Now, Kamau Daáood and A Band of Griots, Piano Spheres, SASSAS, the Long Beach Opera, Polyphony, Classical Underground, wasteLAnd, and Beth Morrison Projects. 

Wende Conversations is a program series that presents lectures, panel discussions and interviews at the museum and online. Supported by Rick Feldman and Susan Horowitz, program highlights include the panel series “In Search of Our Times,” an analysis of our present day through the lens of history; the on-site and online interview series “Art-Past-Present” about the significance of history and memory in contemporary artwork; and the online discussion series “Cold War Spaces,” which uses space as a gateway to Cold War cultural history.

Wende Online 
The Wende Museum has developed a calendar of online programs including the "Art Past Present" discussion series and the "Cold War Spaces" talks. Past "Cold War Spaces" topics have included Private Space in the Soviet Union, Queer Spaces in East Germany, Community Space: Multimedia Art and African American Community Formation in LA, and Aesthetic Space: Artistic Interpretations of Cold War History.

Other ongoing programs include "Friday Night Films at the Wende" and monthly "Family Day at the Wende" workshops.

Programming Highlights 
(De)constructing Ideology: The Cultural Revolution and Beyond (November 13, 2022 – March 12, 2023) was the Wende's first exhibition focused on communist China, exploring the history and artistic production of the Cultural Revolution.

The Medium is the Message: Flags and Banners (April 10, 2022 – October 23, 2022) combined Cold War-era political flags from communist countries and critical appropriations from the period with contemporary artworks.

Soviet Jewish Life (November 14, 2021 –  March 20, 2022) was an exploration of Jewish life in the Soviet Union, focusing on the Refuseniks and on the underground publication and distribution of samizdat materials banned by the authorities.

Questionable History (November 14, 2021 –  March 20, 2022) invited visitors to ask questions about curatorial decisions, exploring how our contemporary moment informs views of history.

Transformations (October 4, 2020 – October 24, 2021) presented the metamorphosis of household and consumer goods from objects of everyday life to items in a museum collection, by way of flea markets.

The Medea Insurrection (November 9, 2019 – April 5, 2020) was the first major exhibition on critical, countercultural, and dissident women artists in Eastern Europe during the Cold War era. Conceptualized and curated by Susanne Altmann for the Albertinum (Staatliche Kunstsammlungen Dresden), it was adapted by the Wende Museum for its Culver City location.

Upside-Down Propaganda: The Art of North Korean Defector Sun Mu (February 10 - June 2, 2019) was the first U.S. museum exhibition of North Korean dissident artist Sun Mu. The exhibition featured paintings in the style of propaganda posters that satirically portrayed the politics of North Korea.

War of Nerves: Psychological Landscapes of the Cold War (September 20 - January 13, 2019) was organized in collaboration with the Wellcome Collection (London). The exhibition looked at the Cold War as “a war of the mind”, exploring the mutual suspicion, fear and mistrust between the Soviet Bloc and the West.Promote, Tolerate, Ban: Art and Culture in Cold War Hungary (May 20 – August 26, 2018) was a joint exhibition presented by the Wende Museum and the Getty Research Institute (GRI) which combined their rich and complementary Hungarian collections to convey the story of Hungary’s visual culture between the 1956 uprising in Budapest and the end of the regime in 1989.

Cold War Spaces (November 19, 2017 - April 29, 2018) explored Cold War era Eastern Europe and the Soviet Union through the physical and ideological spatial relations and divisions of the time.

Competing Utopias (July 13 to September 13, 2014) was organized in collaboration with the Neutra VDL Studio and Residences. The exhibition was an experimental installation of East German modernist interior design objects from the Wende Museum’s collection within the VDL Research House, an iconic mid-century example of California architecture by Austrian-American architect Richard Neutra.Deconstructing Perestroika (January 28 - May 6, 2012) was an exhibition organized in collaboration with the Craft and Folk Art Museum in Los Angeles which featured 24 original, hand-painted poster designs by 13 artists in response to Mikhail Gorbachev's transformative policies of Glasnost and Perestroika in the late 1980s.

Facing the Wall (January 2009 – June 2017) was a long-term installation that reflected upon larger issues of the human impact of the Cold War and the activities, behaviors, and opinions of those living during those tumultuous times. It traced the personal stories of four individuals and explored the complex, interconnected, and often contradictory nature of history.

The Wall Project (November 8, 2009) commemorated the 20th anniversary of the fall of the Berlin Wall with the installation of ten original segments in front of 5900 Wilshire Boulevard. As part of the project, four artists—Marie Astrid González, Farrah Karapetian, Thierry Noir, and Kent Twitchell—were invited to paint the original segments and a temporary replica was painted by the artist Shepard Fairey and others during an event titled "The Wall Across Wilshire" that closed down Wilshire Boulevard and temporarily divided Los Angeles.

Future Museum Activities 
In 2021, the Wende Museum announced that it was one of 45 cultural, educational, and scientific institutions throughout Southern California to receive support from the Getty Foundation for their Pacific Standard Time initiative to explore the intersection of art and science. The planned exhibition “Connected Dreamworlds” is slated for 2024.

The Wende Museum has begun the expansion of its campus through the construction of the Glorya Kaufman Creative Community Center, a mixed-use space for culture, education, and social services, with programming and services provided by multiple Culver City community organizations working in partnership.

Organizational History 
The Wende Museum was founded in 2002 by Justinian Jampol, a native of Los Angeles and scholar of modern European history.

The museum was housed for more than a decade in an office park. In November 2012, the City Council of Culver City voted unanimously to approve a 75-year lease of the former United States National Guard Armory building on Culver Boulevard as the permanent location of the Wende Museum. The Armory building was originally constructed in 1949 as the Cold War began to escalate, and was decommissioned in March 2011. Following renovations, the Wende Museum opened to the public at the Armory site in November 2017, designed in a spirit of transparency. 

The one-acre campus includes a former East German guardhouse that once monitored and controlled access to the Allgemeiner Deutscher Nachrichtendienst (ADN), the state-run, monopoly news agency of the German Democratic Republic. The guardhouse now plays host to installations that explore how a site of control can be reimagined by contemporary artists as a tool for critically examining our contemporary relationship to open communication and state power.

References

External links

 Official Website
 Wende Museum at Google Cultural Institute

2002 establishments in California
Articles containing video clips
Buildings and structures in Culver City, California
Cold War museums in the United States
History museums in California
Military and war museums in California
Museums established in 2002
Museums in Los Angeles County, California
Organizations based in Culver City, California